Sandersleben station is the station of Sandersleben in the German state of Saxony-Anhalt. It lies at the crossing of the Halle–Vienenburg and the Berlin–Blankenheim railway lines in the municipality of Arnstein and was used to connect between two different concentration camps facilitated by the Nazis.

Location 
The station is located in the district of Mansfeld-Südharz near the Harz in southwestern Saxony-Anhalt. The village of Sandersleben has been incorporated in Arnstein since 2010. The station is located in the west of the village near a sports field and the Wipper. In the area of the station there are houses along the railway lines. The Halle–Vienenburg railway run through the eastern part of the station and the Berlin–Blankenheim railway through the western part of the station.

History 

The station was opened on 15 October 1871 with the commissioning of the Könnern–Aschersleben section by the Magdeburg–Halberstadt Railway Company (Magdeburg-Halberstädter Eisenbahngesellschaft, MHE). With the construction of the  Berlin-Blankenheim railway by the Prussian state railways, a second station was built west of the existing facilities. Since the MHE did not allow the state railway to use its entrance building, it opened its own entrance building on 15 May 1879; this was located to the east of the new line, thus between the two lines. After the nationalisation of the MHE in 1879, the building from 1871 was put to other uses.

In the 1980s, three pairs of express trains and some stopping trains ran between Erfurt and Magdeburg via Sandersleben. At this time, an upgrade of the Berlin-Blankenheim railway was planned to relieve the alternative route via Bitterfeld and Naumburg. This would have catered especially for freight traffic. Electrification of the line was then planned, but it was cancelled after the erection of some catenary masts (for example, south of Sandersleben at Blankenheim).

Passenger services

Rail

In the 2017 timetable, the following services operate:

Buses 
Bus route 430 of the Verkehrsgesellschaft Südharz (South Harz Transport Company) connects the station with Hettstedt and Eisleben on weekdays at two-hour intervals. In addition, there are a few additional connections, for example to Bernburger Straße in Sandersleben.

Station precincts

The station is designed as an "island" station, with the track of the Berlin–Blankenheim railway (track 3) lying to the west and the platforms of the Halle–Vienenburg railway (tracks 1 and 2) to the east of the entrance building of the Berlin–Blankenheim railway. The Berlin–Blankenheim railway crosses the Halle–Vienenburg railway to the north of the station. Both lines are connected with each other to the north and south of the entrance building of the Berlin–Blankenheim railway. All tracks have platforms and a pedestrian tunnel connects platforms 1 and 2. The latter is usually no longer used.

The former entrance building of the Magdeburg–Halberstadt Railway Company, which opened the Halle–Vienenburg railway in 1865, stands to the east of platform 2.

Sandersleben station has been upgraded to make it barrier-free.

References

Footnotes

Railway stations in Saxony-Anhalt
Railway stations in Germany opened in 1871
Buildings and structures in Mansfeld-Südharz